The Independent Oracle Users Group (IOUG) represents the voice of Oracle technology and database professionals and empowers them to be more productive in their business and careers by:

Delivering education
Sharing best practices
Providing technology direction and networking opportunities

Incorporating the elements of the G.R.E.A.T. strategy, the IOUG empowers Oracle database and development professionals by delivering the highest quality:

Information
Education
Networking
Advocacy

The IOUG helps each member:

Enhance their skill set with technical content created for users by users
Increase the technical advantage of their organization
Boost their individual marketability
Gain access to a network of peers for collaboration and information exchange
Voice opinions to Oracle about their products, services and policies

This is one of many Oracle User Groups formed as a self-supporting forum for discussion, education and networking outside of the formal Oracle Corporation-sponsored community forums on the Oracle TechNet Discussion Forums.

History
The IOUG was founded in 1993.

Effective 17 September 2005, IOUG changed their name from International Oracle Users Group to the Independent Oracle Users Group.

The last IOUG LIVE conference was hosted in 2005. Starting from 2006, IOUG has jointly participated in the Collaborate unified conference with OAUG and Quest Oracle Community.

In March 2019, it was announced that the IOUG will be joining the Quest Oracle Community. The deal was finalized in May 2019.

Conferences
 2001 - IOUG Live, April 29-May 3 in Orlando, FL
 2002 - IOUG Live, April 14–18 in San Diego, CA
 2003 - IOUG Live, April 28–30, Orlando, FL
 2004 - IOUG Live, April 18–22 in Toronto, Canada
 2005 - IOUG Live, May 1–5 in Orlando, FL
 2006 - Collaborate, April 23–27 in Nashville, TN 
 2007 - Collaborate, April 15–19 in Las Vegas, NV
 2008 - Collaborate, April 13–17 in Denver, CO
 2009 - Collaborate, May 3–7 in Orlando, FL
 2010 - Collaborate, April 18–22 in Las Vegas, NV
 2011 - Collaborate, April 10–14 in Orlando, FL
 2012 - Collaborate 12, April 22–26 in Las Vegas, NV
 2013 - Collaborate 13, April 7–11 in Denver, CO
 2014 - Collaborate 14, April 7–11 in Las Vegas, NV
 2015 - Collaborate 15, April 12-16 in Las Vegas, NV
 2016 - Collaborate 16, April 10-14 in Las Vegas, NV
 2017 - Collaborate 17, April 2-6 in Las Vegas, NV
 2018 - Collaborate 18, April 22-26 in Las Vegas, NV
 2019 - Collaborate 19, April 7-11 in San Antonio, TX

Related Affiliates
 Quest Oracle Community - a 55,000+ international community for Oracle's JD Edwards, PeopleSoft, Cloud Applications, Database & Technology users
 Oracle Applications & Technology Users Group (OATUG) - the user community that provides support for Oracle applications & technology users (formerly OAUG)
 Oracle Developer Tools Users Group (ODTUG) - the user community of developers supporting creation of applications and toolsets for use with Oracle application and database technology
 United Kingdom Oracle Users Group (UKOUG) - formed to support the UK and adjacent Oracle user communities in Western Europe

References

Oracle Corporation
User groups
Organizations established in 1993
2019 mergers and acquisitions